Kelly O'Hara may refer to:

 Kelli O'Hara (born 1976), American actress and singer
 Kelley O'Hara (born 1988), American soccer player